Robert Zabica (born 9 April 1964 in Spearwood, Western Australia) is an Australian former goalkeeper. Zabica represented the Australian national team 28 times in 'A' international matches and also represented Western Australia.

Playing career
Zabica started his career with Cockburn City before joining Adelaide City for seven seasons, winning National Soccer League (NSL) championships in 1992 and 1994. He played for Australia in the qualifiers for the 1994 FIFA World Cup finals, losing narrowly to Argentina. A nagging knee injury forced his international retirement, but he made a comeback in 1995 with Dalmatinac with whom he won the D'Orsogna Cup. He made his State debut at the age of 31, captaining the side that beat West Ham United in 1995, and went on to play a further five times for Western Australia. He returned to national league level in 1997, making seven appearances for Perth Glory and taking his career tally to 202 games. He had a three-match spell in England with Bradford City in late 1997 and returned to Perth to play for Bayswater City SC, Inglewood United and Fremantle City.

Zabica made his international debut for Australia in 1990.

Honours
Adelaide City
National Soccer League Championship: 1991–92, 1993–94
National Cup: 1991–92

Individual
National Soccer League Goalkeeper of the Year: 1991–92
Football Federation Australia Hall of Fame inductee: 2006

References

External links
OzFootball profile

1964 births
Living people
Soccer players from Perth, Western Australia
Australian soccer players
Australian expatriate soccer players
Australia international soccer players
National Soccer League (Australia) players
Adelaide City FC players
Bradford City A.F.C. players
Perth Glory FC players
Australian people of Croatian descent
Stirling Macedonia FC players
Association football goalkeepers
Expatriate footballers in England
English Football League players
Australian expatriate sportspeople in England